The greater black whipsnake (Demansia papuensis) is a species of venomous snake in the family Elapidae.

Description
D. papuensis has a constant light to dark brown or black colouration, and a tan coloured head with small dark spots.

Distribution and Habitat
The snake is found mainly in the northern parts of Australia (the far north-east of Western Australia, north Northern Territory, and Northern Queensland). It lives in open forests and woodlands.

References

Demansia
Snakes of Australia
Reptiles described in 1877
Reptiles of Western Australia
Reptiles of the Northern Territory
Reptiles of Queensland